Lumberton Senior High School is a high school located in Lumberton, North Carolina, serving grades 9–12. It is run by the Public Schools of Robeson County, as it is in Robeson County, North Carolina.

Notable alumni
 Brad Allen  NFL referee
 Penny Fuller  actress
 Yolanda Jones – Puerto Rico women's national basketball team member
 Sean Locklear – NFL offensive tackle
 Mike McIntyre – represented North Carolina's 7th Congressional District in the U.S. House of Representatives
 Jamain Stephens –  NFL offensive tackle
 Donnell Thompson – NFL defensive end
 Tim Worley – NFL running back, played for the Georgia Bulldogs in college

References

Public high schools in North Carolina
Schools in Robeson County, North Carolina